Achardella is a genus of metallic wood-boring beetles in the family Buprestidae. There are about five described species in Achardella.

 Achardella americana (Herbst, 1801)
 Achardella curtula (Kerremans, 1919)
 Achardella denticollis (Fairmaire, 1864)
 Achardella hoscheki (Obenberger, 1916)
 Achardella strandi Obenberger, 1936

References

Buprestidae genera